Elspeth Dudgeon (4 December 1871 – 11 December 1955) was a Scottish character actress. With a career spanning nearly two decades, she was involved in 67 films, only 14 of which included her name in the credits.

Her best known appearances includes The Old Dark House and Becky Sharp (1935). She also acted in Bride of Frankenstein (1935), The Last Outpost (1935), Show Boat (1936), The Prince and the Pauper (1937), The Story of Vernon & Irene Castle (1939), Bulldog Drummond's Secret Police (1939), Calling Dr. Kildare (1939), Pride and Prejudice (1940), Foreign Correspondent (1940), Now, Voyager (1942), The Canterville Ghost (1944), and The Secret Garden (1949).

Early life
Dudgeon was born on 4 December 1871 in Edinburgh, Scotland and developed an interest in theatrics as a young girl. After joining a well known amateur organisation, she became notable for character roles.

Career
Her first break came while she was still in Scotland, when actor-manager Osmond Tearle heard of her ability and booked her to appear in various Shakesperian plays. Before this, she was already well known around Glasgow, such as in her part of a housekeeper in the 1916 play Doorsteps, where her performance was described as "extremely artistic".

During World War I, Dudgeon was part of Lena Ashwell's company, performing for soldiers near the English front, occasionally joined by male soldiers on leave. She also worked for Lydia Yvorska's company. Following her emigration to America, she joined Mr Clive's company as the Copyley Theatre. She first appeared in an uncredited part in Waterloo Bridge (1931), before which she had a long and not very successful career as a theatrical actress.

One of her earlier best remembered appearances was in the role of Sir Roderick Femm in the 1932 film The Old Dark House. Director James Whale needed someone to portray a centenarian and Dudgeon was the oldest actress he knew of, despite her being just 60 at the time. A beard was pasted onto her and she delivered her lines in her own falsetto voice. Having played the part of a man, she was credited as John Dudgeon, with actress Gloria Stuart later commenting that none of the cast at the time were aware Dudgeon was actually a female actress until the cast party. Whale was reported to have enjoyed keeping her real gender a secret, although Dudgeon would later work for him again several years later under her own name and gender. She was also known as playing Miss Pinkerton in Becky Sharp (1935). She featured in some other hit films of the following years, such as Camille (1936), Pride and Prejudice (1940) and a supporting role alongside Charles Laughton in The Canterville Ghost (1944).

Personal life
She lived in California for 23 years.

Death
She died on 11 December 1955, shortly after her 84th birthday, in Los Angeles, California. Her remains are buried at Chapel Of The Pines Crematory.

Filmography

References

External links

 

1871 births
1955 deaths
Actresses from Edinburgh
Scottish actresses
Scottish film actresses
Scottish theatre people
20th-century Scottish actresses